As God Commands, also known as The Crossroads, is a novel by Niccolò Ammaniti.

In 2008, director Gabriele Salvatores adapted the novel into a film of the same name.

Plot
It tells the misadventure of Cristiano Zena, 13 year-old, and his father Rino in an Italian suburban area.

Reception
The Guardian described the novel as "overexplicit" and flipping "over into the truly grotesque". The New Yorker outlined the story of the novel as "grim but redemptive". The Los Angeles Times praised the novel "as gritty as it is suspenseful".

As God Commands won the 2007 Strega Prize with 144/356 votes.

References

External links
 

2006 Italian novels
Strega Prize-winning works
Arnoldo Mondadori Editore books